Common sense  is sound practical judgment concerning everyday matters.

Common sense may also refer to:

Print media
Common Sense, a 1775–76 tract on American independence by Thomas Paine
Common Sense (book series), a 1960s series of political books published in the UK by Victor Gollancz
Common Sense (Benn and Hood book), a 1993 book by Tony Benn and Andrew Hood
Common Sense (American magazine), an American political magazine 1932–1946
Common Sense (Scottish magazine), a magazine of left-wing theory 1987–1999
Common Sense: A Political History, 2011 book by Sophia Rosenfeld
Common Sense, a 1941 novella by Robert A. Heinlein, half of the 1963 novel Orphans of the Sky
Glenn Beck's Common Sense, a 2009 book

Music
Common (rapper), formerly Common Sense
Common Sense (band), an American reggae group
Common Sense (J Hus album), 2017
Common Sense (John Prine album), 1975
Common Sense, an album by Joel Cummins, 2001
"Common Sense", a song by Wilco from Schmilco

Other uses
Common Sense (animation studio), a Japanese animation studio
Common Sense (podcast), an American history podcast by Dan Carlin
Common Sense Media, a San Francisco-based non-profit organization
Scottish common sense realism, a school of philosophy
The Free Press (media company) (previously known as Common Sense), a newsletter and media company

See also
Common Sense Party (disambiguation)